The 2019 European Speed Skating Championships took place in Collalbo, Italy from 11 to 13 January 2019. Skaters from 14 countries participated. It was the second time that the allround and sprint tournaments had taken place at the same time and venue.

Sven Kramer and Ireen Wüst, both from the Netherlands, were the defending champions in the allround event. Kai Verbij from the Netherlands and Karolína Erbanová from the Czech Republic were the defending champions in the sprint event.

Schedule
The schedule of events:

All times are CET (UTC+1).

Allround
DNF = did not finish; DNS = did not start, WDR = withdrew, DQ = disqualified, PR = personal record, TR = track record

Men's championships

Day 2

500 metres

5000 metres

Day 3

1500 metres

10,000 metres

Final ranking

Women's championships

Day 1

500 metres

3000 metres

Day 2

1500 metres

5000 metres

Final ranking

Sprint
DNF = did not finish; DNS = did not start, WDR = withdrew, DQ = disqualified, PR = personal record, TR = track record

Men's championships

Day 1

500 metres

1000 metres

Day 2

500 metres

1000 metres

Final ranking

Women's championships

Day 2

500 metres

1000 metres

Day 3

500 metres

1000 metres

Final ranking

Participating nations 

  (1)
  (3)
  (3)
  (1)
  (2)
  (1)
  (8)
  (1)
  (7)
  (1)
  (12)
  (10)
  (7)
  (11)

See also
 2019 World Allround Speed Skating Championships
 2019 World Sprint Speed Skating Championships

References 

2019 in Italian sport
2019 in speed skating
2019 Allround
January 2019 sports events in Italy
European, 2019